Jaume Durán Nierga (born 26 May 1984) is a Spanish footballer who plays for Palamós CF as a left winger.

Club career
Born in Banyoles, Girona, Catalonia, Durán represented CD Banyoles and Vilobí CF as a youth, and made his senior debut with Tercera División club FE Figueres in 2003. He first arrived in Segunda División B in 2005, after joining neighbouring UE Figueres.

On 31 January 2007, after being rarely used, Durán was loaned to CF Peralada in the fourth level, until June. In July, he moved to fellow league team Palamós CF, scoring a career-best seven goals during the campaign.

On 21 August 2008, Durán moved straight to Segunda División and signed for Girona CF. He made his professional debut nine days later, starting and scoring the game's only in an away success over Celta de Vigo.

Durán was released by the Blanquivermells on 22 June 2009, and returned to his former club Palamós on 10 July. He was regularly used during his four-year spell, and moved to Peralada on 13 August 2013.

On 15 June 2016 Durán returned to Palamós, still in the fourth tier.

References

External links

1984 births
Living people
People from Pla de l'Estany
Sportspeople from the Province of Girona
Spanish footballers
Footballers from Catalonia
Association football wingers
Segunda División players
Segunda División B players
Tercera División players
UE Figueres footballers
CF Peralada players
Palamós CF footballers
Girona FC players
Girona FC B players